Jaclyn Hawkes (born 3 December 1982 in Hong Kong) is a professional squash player who represented New Zealand.

Jaclyn grew up in Hong Kong and lived there until she was 15 when she moved to New Zealand. She started playing squash aged five because her mother Julie Hawkes was a New Zealand representative and is an ex-World Masters champion. While Jaclyn played squash when she was younger she was much more keen on playing tennis (her father Richard was a Davis Cup player for New Zealand), hockey and netball. However, when she moved to New Zealand she made the New Zealand Junior team and travelled to Antwerp for the World Juniors in 1997 and really began to enjoy playing squash. It was after making the New Zealand Senior team in 2004 and competing in Amsterdam at the World Teams event that she decided to make squash her profession.

Jaclyn is now based in Halifax in England after having completed a double degree in law and commerce in 2004 and has been playing full-time since the beginning of 2005.
She reached a career-high world ranking of World No. 12 in December 2010.

References

External links 

1982 births
Living people
New Zealand female squash players
Commonwealth Games gold medallists for New Zealand
Commonwealth Games medallists in squash
Squash players at the 2010 Commonwealth Games
Hong Kong people
Medallists at the 2010 Commonwealth Games